The Macchi M.C.100 was an Italian commercial flying boat designed and built by Macchi.

Design and development
The M.C.100 was a shoulder-wing cantilever monoplane flying boat, with a family resemblance to the military twin-engine M.C.99 and earlier M.C.94. It was powered by three Alfa Romeo 126 RC 10 radial engines strut-mounted above the wing, each driving a three-bladed tractor propeller. The pilot and co-pilot sat side by side in a raised and enclosed control cabin forward of the wing, while the radio operator sat in the aircraft's nose. A main cabin in the hull had accommodation for 26 passengers.

The prototype first flew on 7 January 1939. The prototype was followed by two more aircraft, and all three were in service by June 1940 with Ala Littoria operating between Rome-Algiers-Barcelona. With the start of World War II, the aircraft was used for liaison and communication duties, and to maintain a daily Rome-Marsala-Tripoli service.

Operators

 Ala Littoria

Specifications (M.C.100)

See also

References

 
 
 

M.C.100
1930s Italian airliners
Flying boats
Trimotors
High-wing aircraft
Aircraft first flown in 1939